Rishikesh Gautam (born in 1941) was a politician from Nepal. He was elected to the Pratinidhi Sabha in the 1999 election on behalf of the Nepali Congress.

References

Living people
Nepali Congress politicians from Madhesh Province
1941 births
Nepal MPs 1991–1994
Nepal MPs 1999–2002